The First Czechoslovak Republic, often colloquially referred to as the First Republic (Slovak: Prvá republika), was the first Czechoslovak state that existed from 1918 to 1938, a union of ethnic Czechs and Slovaks. The country was commonly called Czechoslovakia (Czech and ), a compound of Czech and Slovak; which gradually became the most widely used name for its successor states. It was composed of former territories of Austria-Hungary, inheriting different systems of administration from the formerly Austrian (Bohemia, Moravia, a small part of Silesia) and Hungarian territories (mostly Upper Hungary and Carpathian Ruthenia).

After 1933, Czechoslovakia remained the only de facto functioning democracy in Central Europe, organized as a parliamentary republic. Under pressure from its Sudeten German minority, supported by neighbouring Nazi Germany, Czechoslovakia was forced to cede its Sudetenland region to Germany on 1 October 1938 as part of the Munich Agreement. It also ceded southern parts of Slovakia and Carpathian Ruthenia to Hungary and the Zaolzie region in Silesia to Poland. This, in effect, ended the First Czechoslovak Republic. It was replaced by the Second Czechoslovak Republic, which lasted less than half a year before Germany occupied the rest of Czechoslovakia in March 1939.

History 

The independence of Czechoslovakia was proclaimed on 28 October 1918 by the Czechoslovak National Council in Prague. Several ethnic groups and territories with different historical, political, and economic traditions were obliged to be blended into a new state structure. The origin of the First Republic lies in Point 10 of Woodrow Wilson's Fourteen Points: "The peoples of Austria-Hungary, whose place among the nations we wish to see safeguarded and assured, should be accorded the freest opportunity to autonomous development."

The full boundaries of the country and the organization of its government was finally established in the Czechoslovak Constitution of 1920. Tomáš Garrigue Masaryk had been recognized by World War I Allies as the leader of the Provisional Czechoslovak Government,  and in 1920 he was elected the country's first president. He was re-elected in 1925 and 1929, serving as President until 14 December 1935 when he resigned due to poor health. He was succeeded by Edvard Beneš.

Following the Anschluss of Austria by Germany in March 1938, the Nazi leader Adolf Hitler's next target for annexation was Czechoslovakia. His pretext was the privations suffered by ethnic German populations living in Czechoslovakia's northern and western border regions, known collectively as the Sudetenland. Their incorporation into Nazi Germany would leave the rest of Czechoslovakia powerless to resist subsequent occupation.

Politics 

To a large extent, Czechoslovak democracy was held together by the country's first president, Tomáš Masaryk. As the principal founding father of the republic, Masaryk was regarded similar to the way George Washington is regarded in the United States. Such universal respect enabled Masaryk to overcome seemingly irresolvable political problems. Masaryk is still regarded as the symbol of Czechoslovak democracy for the Czechs and Slovaks today.

The Constitution of 1920 approved the provisional constitution of 1918 in its basic features. The Czechoslovak state was conceived as a parliamentary democracy, guided primarily by the National Assembly, consisting of the Senate and the Chamber of Deputies, whose members were to be elected on the basis of universal suffrage. The National Assembly was responsible for legislative initiative and was given supervisory control over the executive and judiciary as well. Every seven years it elected the president and confirmed the cabinet appointed by him. Executive power was to be shared by the president and the cabinet; the latter, responsible to the National Assembly, was to prevail. The reality differed somewhat from this ideal, however, during the strong presidencies of Masaryk and his successor, Beneš. The constitution of 1920 provided for the central government to have a high degree of control over local government. From 1928 and 1940, Czechoslovakia was divided into the four "lands"; Bohemia, Moravia-Silesia, Slovakia, and Carpathian Ruthenia. Although in 1927 assemblies were provided for Bohemia, Slovakia, and Ruthenia, their jurisdiction was limited to adjusting laws and regulations of the central government to local needs. The central government appointed one third of the members of these assemblies. The constitution identified the "Czechoslovak nation" as the creator and principal constituent of the Czechoslovak state and established Czech and Slovak as official languages. The concept of the Czechoslovak nation was necessary in order to justify the establishment of Czechoslovakia towards the world, because otherwise the statistical majority of the Czechs as compared to Germans would have been rather weak, and there were more Germans in the state than Slovaks.  National minorities were assured special protection; in districts where they constituted 20% of the population, members of minority groups were granted full freedom to use their language in everyday life, in schools, and in matters dealing with authorities.

The operation of the new Czechoslovak government was distinguished by stability. Largely responsible for this were the well-organized political parties that emerged as the real centers of power. Excluding the period from March 1926 to November 1929, when the coalition did not hold, a coalition of five Czechoslovak parties constituted the backbone of the government: Republican Party of Agricultural and Smallholder People, Czechoslovak Social Democratic Party, Czechoslovak National Social Party, Czechoslovak People's Party, and Czechoslovak National Democratic Party. The leaders of these parties became known as the "Pětka" (pron. pyetka) (The Five). The Pětka was headed by Antonín Švehla, who held the office of prime minister for most of the 1920s and designed a pattern of coalition politics that survived until 1938. The coalition's policy was expressed in the slogan "We have agreed that we will agree." German parties also participated in the government in the beginning of 1926. Hungarian parties, influenced by irredentist propaganda from Hungary, never joined the Czechoslovak government but were not openly hostile:

 The Republican Party of Agricultural and Smallholder People was formed in 1922 from a merger of the Czech Agrarian Party and the Slovak Agrarian Party. Led by Svehla, the new party became the principal voice for the agrarian population, representing mainly peasants with small and medium-sized farms. Svehla combined support for progressive social legislation with a democratic outlook. His party was the core of all government coalitions between 1922 and 1938.
 The Czechoslovak Social Democratic Party was considerably weakened when the communists seceded in 1921 to form the Communist Party of Czechoslovakia, but by 1929 it had begun to regain its strength. A party of moderation, the Czechoslovak Social Democratic Party declared in favor of parliamentary democracy in 1930. Antonín Hampl was chairman of the party, and Ivan Dérer was the leader of its Slovak branch.
 The Czechoslovak National Social Party (called the Czech Socialist Party until 1926) was created before World War I when the socialists split from the Social Democratic Party. It rejected class struggle and promoted nationalism. Led by Václav Klofáč, its membership derived primarily from the lower middle class, civil servants, and the intelligentsia (including Beneš).
 The Czechoslovak People's Partya fusion of several Catholic parties, groups, and labor unionsdeveloped separately in Bohemia in 1918 and in the more strongly Catholic Moravia in 1919. In 1922 a common executive committee was formed, headed by Jan Šrámek. The Czechoslovak People's Party espoused Christian moral principles and the social encyclicals of Pope Leo XIII.
 The Czechoslovak National Democratic Party developed from a post–World War I merger of the Young Czech Party with other right wing and center parties. Ideologically, it was characterized by national radicalism and economic liberalism. Led by Kramář and Alois Rašín, the Czechoslovak National Democratic Party became the party of big business, banking, and industry. The party declined in influence after 1920, however.

Foreign policy 
Edvard Beneš, Czechoslovak foreign minister from 1918 to 1935, created the system of alliances that determined the republic's international stance until 1938. A democratic statesman of Western orientation, Beneš relied heavily on the League of Nations as guarantor of the post war status quo and the security of newly formed states. He negotiated the Little Entente (an alliance with Yugoslavia and Romania) in 1921 to counter Hungarian revanchism and Habsburg restoration. He concluded a separate alliance with France. Beneš's Western policy received a serious blow as early as 1925. The Locarno Pact, which paved the way for Germany's admission to the League of Nations, guaranteed Germany's western border. French troops were thus left immobilized on the Rhine, making French assistance to Czechoslovakia difficult. In addition, the treaty stipulated that Germany's eastern frontier would remain subject to negotiation. When Adolf Hitler came to power in 1933, fear of German aggression became widespread in eastern Central Europe. Beneš ignored the possibility of a stronger Central European alliance system, remaining faithful to his Western policy. He did, however, seek the participation of the Soviet Union in an alliance to include France. (Beneš's earlier attitude towards the Soviet regime had been one of caution.) In 1935, the Soviet Union signed treaties with France and Czechoslovakia. In essence, the treaties provided that the Soviet Union would come to Czechoslovakia's aid only if French assistance came first.

In 1935, when Beneš succeeded Masaryk as president, the prime minister Milan Hodža took over the Ministry of Foreign Affairs. Hodža's efforts to strengthen alliances in Central Europe came too late. In February 1936, the foreign ministry came under the direction of Kamil Krofta, an adherent of Beneš's line.

The Czechoslovak Republic sold armament to Bolivia during the Chaco War (1932–35) and sent, close to the end of the war, an unofficial training mission, to support Bolivia in its Chaco war with Paraguay and advance Czechoslovak interest in Bolivia.

Economy 
The new nation had a population of over 13.5 million. It had inherited 70 to 80% of all the industry of the Austro-Hungarian Empire, including the porcelain and glass industries and the sugar refineries; more than 40% of all its distilleries and breweries; the Škoda Works of Pilsen (Plzeň), which produced armaments, locomotives, automobiles, and machinery; and the chemical industry of northern Bohemia. Seventeen percent of all Hungarian industry that had developed in Slovakia during the late 19th century also fell to the republic. Czechoslovakia was one of the world's 10 most industrialized states. 

The Czech lands were far more industrialized than Slovakia. In Bohemia, Moravia, and Silesia, 39% of the population was employed in industry and 31% in agriculture and forestry. Most light and heavy industry was located in the Sudetenland and was owned by Germans and controlled by German-owned banks. Czechs controlled only 20 to 30% of all industry. In Slovakia, 17.1% of the population was employed in industry, and 60.4% worked in agriculture and forestry. Only 5% of all industry in Slovakia was in Slovak hands. Carpathian Ruthenia was essentially without industry.

In the agricultural sector, a program of reform introduced soon after the establishment of the republic was intended to rectify the unequal distribution of land. One-third of all agricultural land and forests belonged to a few aristocratic landowners—mostly Germans (or Germanized Czechs – e.g. Kinsky, Czernin or Kaunitz) and Hungarians—and the Roman Catholic Church. Half of all holdings were under 20,000 m2. The Land Control Act of April 1919 called for the expropriation of all estates exceeding 1.5 square kilometres of arable land or 2.5 square kilometres of land in general (5 square kilometres to be the absolute maximum). Redistribution was to proceed on a gradual basis; owners would continue in possession in the interim, and compensation was offered.

Ethnic groups 
1921 ethnonational census

National disputes arose due to the fact that the more numerous Czechs dominated the central government and other national institutions, all of which had their seats in the Bohemian capital Prague. The Slovak middle class had been extremely small in 1919 because Hungarians, Germans and Jews had previously filled most administrative, professional and commercial positions in, and as a result, the Czechs had to be posted to the more backward Slovakia to take up the administrative and professional posts. The position of the Jewish community, especially in Slovakia, was ambiguous and, increasingly, a significant part looked towards Zionism.

Furthermore, most of Czechoslovakia's industry was as well located in Bohemia and Moravia and there mainly in the German speaking Borderlands, while most of Slovakia's economy came from agriculture. In Carpatho-Ukraine, the situation was even worse, with basically no industry at all. Therefore the Borderlands were also more heavily hit by the world economy crisis. This fact, the fact, that the central government did little to help out and even supported more the Czech companies led to the fact, that unemployment among the German community was the double, than it was among the Czech. Further steps like the loss of jobs for German speaking state employees, who did not speak Czech, which were employed earlier in the old Austrian empire or expropriations of big estates did not support the coherence within the state. Nethertheless still in 1929, for example, in the Carlsbad district, a mainly Bavarian speaking area, 46% still voted for Socialists and Communists. This is especially interesting, because the German Speaking community of the Bohemian Countries is often and from many side blamed for being nationalist and fascist. But the point of living in the or one of the most industrialized areas of Europe also brings a big support for Communist and Socialist Parties, which from another point of view may also be explained by heavy and long lasting traditions of mining industries in the area. 

Still nationalism arose in the non-Czech nationalities, and several parties and movements were formed with the aim of broader political autonomy, like the Sudeten German Party led by Konrad Henlein and the Hlinka's Slovak People's Party led by Andrej Hlinka.

The German minority living in Sudetenland demanded autonomy from the Czechoslovak government, claiming they were suppressed and repressed. In the 1935 Parliamentary elections, the newly founded Sudeten German Party, led by Konrad Henlein and mostly financed by Nazi German money, received over two-thirds of the Sudeten German vote. As a consequence, diplomatic relations between the Germans and the Czechs deteriorated further.

Administrative divisions 
 1918–1923: Different systems in former Austrian territory (Bohemia, Moravia, a small part of Silesia) compared to former Hungarian territory (mostly Upper Hungary and Carpathian Ruthenia): three lands (země) (also called district units (kraje): Bohemia, Moravia, Silesia, plus 21 counties (župy) in today's Slovakia and three counties in today's Ruthenia; both lands and counties were divided into districts (okresy).
 1923–1927: As above, except that the Slovak and Ruthenian counties were replaced by six (grand) counties ((veľ)župy) in Slovakia and one (grand) county in Ruthenia, and the numbers and boundaries of the okresy were changed in those two territories.
 1928–1938: Four lands (Czech: země, Slovak: krajiny): Bohemia, Moravia-Silesia, Slovakia and sub Carpathian Ruthenia, divided into districts (okresy).

See also 
 Germans in Czechoslovakia (1918–1938)
 Hungarians in Slovakia
 Polish minority in the Czech Republic
 Ruthenians and Ukrainians in Czechoslovakia (1918–1938)
 Slovaks in Czechoslovakia (1918–38)
 Jews in Slovakia

References

Bibliography 

 Kárník, Zdeněk: Malé dějiny československé (1867–1939), Dokořán (2008), Praha,  
 Olivová, Věra: Dějiny první republiky, Karolinum Press (2000), Praha,  
 Peroutka, Ferdinand: Budování státu I.-IV., Academia (2003), Praha,  
 Gen. František Moravec: Špión jemuž nevěřili  
 Axworthy, Mark W.A. Axis Slovakia—Hitler's Slavic Wedge, 1938–1945, Bayside, N.Y. : Axis Europa Books, 2002, 

1918
Czechoslovak Republic 01
Czechoslovak Republic 01
Czechoslovakia
1910s in Czechoslovakia
.
.
States and territories established in 1918
States and territories disestablished in 1938

1918 establishments in Europe
1938 disestablishments in Europe
.1918
Power sharing
1918

es:Checoslovaquia#La primera república (1918-1938)